Marmarica in ancient geography was a littoral area in Ancient Libya, located between Cyrenaica and Aegyptus. It corresponds to what is now the Libya and Egypt frontier, including the towns of Bomba (ancient Phthia), Timimi (ancient Paliurus), Tobruk (ancient Antipyrgus), Acroma (ancient Gonia),  Bardiya, As-Salum, and Sidi Barrani (ancient Zygra). The territory stretched to the far south, encompassing the Siwa Oasis, which at the time was known for its sanctuary to the deity Amun. The eastern part of Marmarica, by some geographers considered a separate district between Marmarica and Aegyptus, was known as Libycus Nomus. In late antiquity, Marmarica was also known as Libya Inferior, while Cyrenaica was known as Libya Superior.

Libya is found in Africa and is  located west of the Nile, more precisely west of the mouth of the Nile at Canopus. The Periplus of Pseudo-Scylax names the Adyrmachidae as the first people of Libya (Africa).
Marmarica proper was delimited towards the east by the escarpment of  Catabathmus Magnus, now known as Akabah el-Kebir, at Salum.

Under the Roman Empire, Marmarica included the Libycus Nomus, located between the Catabathmus and the Bay of Plinthine (Sinus Plinthinetes). This area had formerly been considered part of Egypt. The city of Paraetonium (also Ammonia, modern Mersa Matruh) was the westernmost town of Egypt, for which reason it together with Pelusium was known as the "horns of Egypt". About 10 stadia west of Paraetonium was Apis, marking the border to the Libyan Nomos. Menelaus Portus (near modern Zawiyat Umm Rukbah), according to tradition founded by Menelaus, was known as the site of the death of Agesilaus II.

The inhabitants of Marmarica were known generically as Marmaridae, but they are given the special names of 
Adyrmachidae and Giligammae in the coastal districts, and of Nasamones and Augilae in the interior. 
The Adyrmachidae are said to have differed considerably from the nomadic tribes of the country, strongly resembling the Egyptians.
The territory south of the Libyan Nomos was inhabited by the Ammonii, centered on the celebrated and fertile oasis of Ammon (Siwa)

Both Cyrenaica and Marmarica were included in  the diocese of Egypt in the 4th century, within the larger Praetorian prefecture of the East (while Tripolitania was in the Praetorian prefecture of Italy).

Episcopal sees 

Ancient episcopal sees of the Roman province of Marmarica or Libya Inferior listed in the Annuario Pontificio as titular sees:

For the sees of Libya Superior see Cyrenaica.

See also
North Africa during Antiquity
Butnan District
Matrouh Governorate
Libyan Desert

References

External links 
Charles Anthon, A system of ancient and mediæval geography for the use of schools and colleges, Harper & brothers, 1855, 722-224.
George Kish, A Source book in geography, Harvard University Press, 1978, p. 24.
Leonhard Schmitz, A manual of ancient geography, Blanchard and Lea, 1857, 383-384.

Geographic history of Egypt
Geographic history of Libya
Historical regions